Douglas Clarke (19 January 1934 – 11 August 2019) was an English footballer who played for Darwen, Bury, Hull City, Torquay United and Bath City.

References

1934 births
2019 deaths
Footballers from Bolton
English footballers
Association football wingers
Darwen F.C. players
Bury F.C. players
Hull City A.F.C. players
Torquay United F.C. players
Bath City F.C. players
English Football League players